Maksim Semenov may refer to:

 Maxim Semyonov (born 1984), Kazakhstani ice hockey defenceman
 Maksim Semenov (wrestler) (born 1979), Russian Greco-Roman wrestler